The Art and Culture Center/Hollywood is an arts venue in Hollywood, Florida at 1650 Harrison Street in Broward County. The Art and Culture Center/Hollywood was founded in 1975 as the only visual arts non-profit organization in south Broward County, operating out of a small community space on Hollywood beach. The Center now manages visual arts galleries in the renovated Kagey Home built in 1924, an Arts School that is adjacent to the main facility, and a 500-seat theater in Hollywood’s burgeoning downtown. (US 1 and Monroe Street).

Arts instruction for youth links all curricula to other core subjects, such as math, science, literacy, and cultural studies. This shows students, from pre-K to high school, how the visual and performing arts may inform all facets of learning. Programs include Summer Arts Camp, the leadership development program Arts Aspire, Free Arts! Family Days, the Distance Learning Arts Studio, Stage Kids – Encore, ARTastic Collaborations, and Early Voices. In 2016, the Center received an ArtsEd Forever! award from the Broward Cultural Division for Exceptional Service & Outstanding Contributions to Arts Education in Broward County.

In March 2019, the Center was designated for $2.5 million in funds from the City of Hollywood towards its Arts Ignite! building initiative, as part of a General Obligation Bond referendum that was approved by Hollywood voters. These funds will be allocated toward the expansion of Center facilities over two phases, with construction scheduled to begin in 2021 on a new Arts Education building that will adjoin the Kagey Home.

Through its programs and facilities, the Center fosters a creative environment where new and challenging work can flourish through exhibitions and art-making activities that reflect the highest standards of artistry and diversity.

History of Art and Culture Center Building 

TKagey and his 11-man team sold $426,260 in properties in just 10 weeks. First prize was a choice of a car or $5,000. Kagey took the money since he already owned two cars.

The home shares many features of Joseph Young's house on Hollywood Boulevard. The space that now houses the main exhibition gallery was once the garden (hence the fountain). The current Executive Director's office was the master bedroom and the library was the living room (the original fireplace remains).

The home was owned in the 1930s by an industrialist who manufactured Brillo pads, and in the '40s was rumored to have been a gambling parlor, according to Bill Foster, whose twin brother Edward lived here with his wife and three children in the 1950s. This remained a private residence until 1960 when the Foster family converted it into a funeral home. The Fosters doubled the size of the home, which became the Johnson-Foster Funeral Home, to 12,000-square feet.

References 
History of the Art and Culture Center/Hollywood
History of the Kagey Mansion

External links 

 

Arts centers in Florida
Education in Broward County, Florida
Museums in Broward County, Florida
Hollywood, Florida